Nicola Pistoia (born  31 March 1954) is an Italian actor, director and playwright.

Life and career 
Born  in Rome, Pistoia became first known thanks to his association with actor and  playwright Pino Ammendola, with whom he wrote and starred in a large number of successful comedy plays. Later, Pistoia himself directed a number of plays he wrote, including Binario and Sono emozionato. Also active in films and on television, in 2001 he made his film  directorial debut with Stregati dalla luna, an adaptation of one of his stage works.

Selected filmography 
 Little Misunderstandings (1989)
 Vietato ai minori (1992) 
 Quattro bravi ragazzi (1993) 
 Caro maestro (TV, 1996-1997) 
 L'avvocato Porta (TV, 1997-2000)  
 Finalmente soli (TV, 1999–2004) 
 Viva l'Italia (2012)

References

External links 
 

1954 births
20th-century Italian male actors
21st-century Italian male actors
Italian male film actors
Italian male television actors
Italian male stage actors
Male actors from Rome
Living people
Italian dramatists and playwrights